Digital Productions was a computer animation company in Los Angeles, California, that produced advertisements and special effects for films in the 1980s.

The company was founded by John Whitney, Jr. and Gary Demos in 1982, following their departure from Triple-I. They received financial support from Control Data Corporation. Whitney and Demos felt that greater computer power was needed to produce effects such as those being made by Triple-I for Tron; Digital Productions became famous for using a Cray X-MP supercomputer to render their animations. The company referred to its animation as "Digital Scene Simulation."

Digital Productions first feature film project was the hyperspace sequence in the film, "The Ice Pirates" then went on to create 27 minutes of animation, in 300 scenes, for the film The Last Starfighter.  Each frame of the animation contained an average of 250,000 polygons, and had a resolution of 3000 x 5000 36-bit pixels; they claimed that the imagery was 50 times more complex than the graphics in previous feature films. They estimated that using computer animation required only half the time, and one half to one third the cost, that would have been required if then-traditional methods had been used.

Other work done by the company includes effects for Labyrinth, 2010, and Mick Jagger's "Hard Woman" music video.

In 1986, Digital Productions was bought out by Omnibus Computer Graphics in Toronto for 6 million US$, who also took over Robert Abel and Associates (7.3 million US$) and purchased Triple-I's Foonly computer, all using money from Royal Bank Canada. Next year in May 1987, Omnibus Computers Graphics defaulted on its loan agreements and with 30 million US$ debt, closed its doors in October 1987.

Notes

References
 
 

Computer animation
Visual effects companies